Legend of Hyang Dan is a 2-episode Korean TV drama that first aired on September 3, 2007 on MBC.

Plot
A "what if" parody of Legend of Chun Hyang, based on the classic Korean story Chunhyangga. What if Lee Mong-ryong fell in love with the servant girl Hyang-dan instead of Chun-hyang?

Cast
Seo Ji-hye as Hyang-dan
Choi Si-won as Lee Mong-ryong
Lee Ji-soo as Chun-hyang
Heo Jung-min as Bang-ja
Bang Eun-hee as Wol-mae (Chun-hyang's mother)
Im Hyun-sik as Heo-joon
Jung Han-heon as Shim Hak-gyoo
Kim Dong-hyun as Seok Ho-pil
Kim Se-ah as Seok Ho-soon

References

External links
 

MBC TV television dramas
South Korean historical television series
Works based on The Tale of Chunhyang